Livoišta is a village in the municipality of Ohrid, North Macedonia. It used to be part of the former municipality of Kosel.

Demographics
According to the 2002 census, the village had a total of 178 inhabitants. Ethnic groups in the village include:

Macedonians 178

References

Villages in Ohrid Municipality